Nothing but the Truth is a 1941 American comedy film starring Bob Hope and Paulette Goddard, their third movie together in three years. The movie was directed by Elliott Nugent.

The premise of the film, that the protagonist must tell the truth for the next 24 hours, is based on a play of the same name written by James Montgomery, itself loosely adapted from the 1914 novel Nothing But the Truth by Frederic S. Isham.  The book and play had previously formed the basis of a 1929 movie, also called Nothing But the Truth, starring Richard Dix and Wynne Gibson.  The 1941 film follows the plot of the play much more closely than the 1929 version. The same premise was used for a 1997 Jim Carrey movie, Liar Liar.

Plot
Steve Bennett is a stockbroker in Miami, Florida who has just accepted a position working for a man named T.T. Ralston. He is persuaded by Ralston's beautiful niece Gwen Saunders, to invest a sum of $10,000 that she needs doubled in 24 hours.  Ralston has promised Gwen that if she raises $20,000 he will double it, but has been working behind her back to prevent her from raising the initial funds.

When Steve objects to Ralston's practice of pushing bad stocks onto his clients, he claims that he could get by just as well by telling the truth as by lying. Ralston and his partner Dick Donnelly, along with client Tom van Dusen (Gwen's boyfriend), bet Steve that he can't be completely honest for twenty-four hours straight. Steve bets the $10,000 he got from Gwen. One of the conditions is that no one can reveal the bet to an outsider and it can't be cancelled.

Steve is meticulously watched by the three men during the next twenty-four hours. They are entertaining guests and clients on Ralston's yacht during much of this time, and when Steve is honest with everyone he meets, he manages to insult several of them. In the late evening, an exotic dancer named Linda Graham enters the yacht, looking for Dick, who has promised her backing for her show. Linda meets and talks to Steve, telling him about the show. Mrs. Ralston and another distinguished woman overhear the conversation and mistakenly believes Linda is Steve's wife.

During the night, the partners steal Steve's clothes to prevent him from leaving the ship, but he borrows a dress from Linda. In disguise, Steve sneaks into Gwen's room at her invitation. He tells her that he isn't married to Linda and that he is in love with her.

The next day Steve gets heat from every direction. Gwen finds out that he has been in Linda's room during the night, the ladies sees him as indecent, and Tom because he is in love with Gwen and jealous. On top of this Linda is telling everyone that she is indeed married to Steve and that they have a child together, being in cahoots with Dick to make things harder for Steve.

Close to when the twenty-four hours are up, a man named Mr. Bishop enters the ship. He is the head of the charity organization to which Gwen intended to give the $40,000. Mr. Bishop asks to see the money, and Gwen, who has learned about the bet, tries to keep the man occupied, buying some extra time to help Steve win the bet.

The clocks on the boat have been put forward by the partners, and when they strike four Steve is able to lie to Mr. Bishop about the money. The partners celebrate since they have won the bet, but it turns out Steve's valet had reset the clocks when he noticed they were wrong. Thus, Steve wins the bet and has managed to double Gwen's money after all. He tells everyone on the yacht that he had made a bet that he would lie for the past twenty-four hours, and his honor is restored. Gwen takes a liking to him and awards him a kiss.

Cast

Bob Hope as Steve Bennett
Paulette Goddard as Gwen Saunders
Edward Arnold as T.T. Ralston
Leif Erickson as Van
Helen Vinson as Linda Graham
Willie Best as Samuel
Glenn Anders as Dick Donnelly
Grant Mitchell as Mr. Bishop
Catherine Doucet as Mrs. Van Dusen
Rose Hobart as Mrs. Donnelly
Clarence Kolb as Mr. Van Dusen
Mary Forbes as Mrs. Ralston
Leon Belasco as Dr. Zarak
Helene Millard as Miss Turner

Radio adaptation
Nothing but the Truth was presented on Old Gold Comedy Theatre January 14, 1945. The adaptation starred Anne Baxter and Alan Young.

References

External links

1941 films
1941 comedy films
American comedy films
American black-and-white films
Films directed by Elliott Nugent
Paramount Pictures films
Films based on American novels
1940s English-language films
1940s American films